Gulliver's Travels is a 2010 American fantasy adventure comedy film directed by Rob Letterman in his live-action directorial debut, produced by John Davis and Gregory Goodman, written by Joe Stillman and Nicholas Stoller with music by Henry Jackman. It is loosely based on Part One of the 1726 novel of the same name by Jonathan Swift, though the film takes place in the modern day. It stars Jack Black in the title role, Jason Segel, Emily Blunt, Amanda Peet, Billy Connolly, Chris O'Dowd, T.J Miller, James Corden and Catherine Tate, and is exclusively distributed by 20th Century Fox.

The film was theatrically released on December 25, 2010, in the United States. Even though the film received generally negative reviews, it earned $237.4 million on a $112 million budget. Gulliver's Travels was released on DVD and Blu-ray Disc on April 19, 2011, by 20th Century Fox Home Entertainment.

This was the last 20th Century Fox film to use its 75th Anniversary variant.

Plot
Deeply depressed at his dead-end job in the mail room of a New York City newspaper, Lemuel Gulliver decides to impress journalist Darcy Silverman. He convinces her he could write a report about his (false) extensive world "travels" saying his dream is to become a writer. After suffering writer's block and thinking that Darcy will not want to hang out with a "guy from the mailroom", Gulliver plagiarises a report from other publications on the internet. The next day, Darcy, impressed by his writing, presents Gulliver with a new task – to travel to the Bermuda Triangle and write an article about the legends of ships mysteriously disappearing there.

Upon arriving in Bermuda, Gulliver rents a ship and travels into the triangle. After falling asleep at the helm of his ship, Gulliver is caught in a freak storm and the ship is overwhelmed by a waterspout. Gulliver washes up unconscious on the shore of Lilliput, where he is immediately confirmed as a "beast" by the town's tiny people. After the citizens claim him to be dangerous because of his size, Gulliver is captured and imprisoned in a cave. There, he meets another prisoner named Horatio who was jailed by General Edward because he loves Princess Mary of Lilliput, despite Edward also pursuing her. After the island across from Lilliput, Blefuscia, orders some commandos to kidnap Princess Mary, Gulliver manages to break free of the plough-machine he is forced to work and then rescues the princess from being kidnapped. Gulliver also saves her father, King Theodore, from a fire by urinating on it.

Gulliver is declared a hero by Lilliput's citizens and lies that he is the President of Manhattan, says Yoda is his vice-president and a living legend in his homeland. Edward, however, becomes enraged due to the luxurious accommodations that have been built for Gulliver, and for being presented as an honorary general of the Lilliputian Army complete with uniform. The townspeople find Gulliver's boat and his things, when Gulliver receives angry voicemails from Darcy, who has to take his place and travel to Bermuda now, and she has found out about his plagiarism and now hates him. The next day, chaos ensues as the Blefuscian Navy lays siege to the city when Edward shuts down its defense system as an act of revenge for Gulliver's treatment. Gulliver defeats the armada, invulnerable to the cannonballs being fired at him (although he receives numerous welts on his stomach). Embarrassed once more, and with Mary no longer wanting to have anything to do with him, Edward defects to the Blefuscians and brings with him blueprints of a robot he had made from a page he'd seen from Gulliver's Guitar Hero III game manual. The Blefuscians secretly build the robot, with Edward as the pilot.

The Blefuscians invade Lilliput and the robot-wielding Edward makes Gulliver admit to the people that he is "just the guy from the mail-room" and nothing more. Edward banishes Gulliver to the shores of "the island where we dare not go" (Brobdingnag). There, he is snatched up by a "little" girl (Glumdalclitch) who towers over him. She captures him easily by trapping him inside a glass cup. When Gulliver wakes up, he finds himself in a pink dress in a bedroom of a doll house which begins to shake when the "little girl" pulls apart the wall of the bedroom who begins to stare emotionlessly and ominously at a tiny defenseless Gulliver. He then screams fearfully at the sight of the quiet giant "little" girl, she shoves a milk bottle in his mouth and forcefully feeds him excess milk. The girl treats him as a doll, playing with him roughly. Horatio, who has gone to find Gulliver after being spurned by Mary, reveals to Gulliver that Darcy was imprisoned by the Blefuscians after she was lost in the Bermuda Triangle in the same manner as Gulliver. Gulliver narrowly escapes with him, using a parachute that he took from the skeleton of a dead U.S. Air Force pilot sitting in the dollhouse.

Once again accepting a duel from Edward, this time not only for Lilliput's freedom but for its fate as well – as Edward threatens to destroy it should Gulliver fail – Gulliver ultimately defeats him with the assistance of Horatio, who disables the machine's electrocuting weapon. Horatio is hailed a hero and gets King Theodore's permission to court the princess. Edward, reaching the point of insanity, threatens to kill the princess, but the princess, finally having enough of Edward, punches the traitor in the face in frustration. When King Theodore decides to sentence all Blefuscians to the gallows or to prepare for war, Gulliver then helps to make peace between the rival island-nations by reciting Edwin Starr's "War" and he, along with Darcy, return to New York City on their repaired ship. The film ends with Gulliver, now a legitimate travel writer, taking Darcy to lunch while holding hands, after returning from another travel assignment.

Cast
 Jack Black as Lemuel Gulliver, a mail-room worker who becomes a journalist after plagiarizing a report and winds up in Lilliput after encountering a storm
 Jason Segel as Horatio, a man from Lilliput who Gulliver befriends
 Emily Blunt as Princess Mary, the princess of Lilliput and King Theodore's daughter
 Amanda Peet as Darcy Silverman, a journalist and Gulliver's girlfriend 
 Billy Connolly as King Theodore, the king of Lilliput and Mary's father
 Chris O'Dowd as General Edward Edwardian, the commander of the Lilliput Army who begins despising Gulliver
 T.J. Miller as Dan Quint
 James Corden as Jinks
 Catherine Tate as Queen Isabelle, the queen of Lilliput
 Olly Alexander as Prince August

Production
In a January 2010 interview on The Late Late Show with Craig Ferguson, Segel explained his character spends most of the film in Black's shirt pocket. The film features 7.1 surround audio in select theaters. The name of Liliput's rival country, Blefuscu, was also changed to Blefuscia. Filming of the Lilliput royal palace was at Blenheim Palace. Miniature 1:12 scale dolls' house furniture and accessories from Derbyshire firm The Dolls House Emporium were used to bring the movie alive with less need for special effects. Jonathan Swift, the original author of the novel that the film was loosely based on, is not mentioned during the credits, despite the titles mentioning that the film is not an original piece.

Soundtrack
A soundtrack album of Henry Jackman's score was released by Varese Sarabande. Rock music and film themes that appear in the film include:

 "Rock and Roll All Nite" – Performed by Kiss
 "Listen To Mama" – Performed by Walkerman
 "Rose's Theme" – Written by James Horner
 "The Imperial March" – Written by John Williams
 "Sweet Child o' Mine" – Performed by Guns N' Roses
 "Kiss" – Performed by Taylor Graves
 "War" – Written by Norman Whitfield (as Norman J. Whitfield) and Barrett Strong
 "(I Keep On) Rising Up" – Written and Performed by Mike Doughty

Release

Marketing
The official trailer for the film was released on June 3, 2010; and attached to Marmaduke a day after. The second trailer was released on November 5, 2010, and it is also attached with Megamind. As a prize on the television show Survivor: Nicaragua, four of its contestants were able to watch the film before its release.

Originally scheduled for release on June 4, 2010, it was released on December 25, 2010. 20th Century Fox later announced on March 23, 2010, that the film would be converted to 3D. On December 13, 20th Century Fox announced that it would again move the release date, this time to December 25, 2010.

The film was accompanied by an Ice Age short titled Scrat's Continental Crack-up.

Home media
Gulliver's Travels was released on DVD and Blu-ray Disc on April 19, 2011, by 20th Century Fox Home Entertainment and it was released on Disney+ on May 21, 2021.

Reception

Critical response
On review aggregation website Rotten Tomatoes, the film has an approval rating of 20% based on 120 reviews, with an average rating of 4.10/10. The site's critical consensus reads, "Though Jack Black is back doing what he does best, Gulliver's Travels largely fails to do any justice to its source material, relying instead on juvenile humor and special effects." On Metacritic, the film has a score of 33 out of 100 based on reviews from 32 critics, indicating "generally unfavorable reviews". Audiences polled by CinemaScore gave the film an average grade of "B−" on an A+ to F scale.

The Hollywood Reporter commented that "any sense of fun slowly drains away as the movie insists on highlighting effects over character and story" while Time Out gave it 2 out of 5 stars, commenting that the film "veers between the very mildly chucklesome and plain not funny." The Christian Science Monitor called it "a movie of such stupendous uninspiration" that it was "monumentally dreadful" and the San Francisco Chronicle called it "cute" but "sleep-inducing." Slant Magazine rated the film 1.5 out of 4 stars and Empire rated 2 out of 5 stars calling it "a low-grade comedy that'll have Jonathan Swift turning in his grave." 

Conversely, Roger Ebert commented that knowing whom the film is for, and whom it is not for, might help viewers appreciate it. He awarded the film three out of four stars.

Box office
Gulliver's Travels opened to  $6.3 million for its opening weekend, landing at #8 in the US; this ranks it as the 84th worst opening for a film with a wide release tracked by Box Office Mojo. The film grossed $42.8 million in the US and Canada and $194.6 million in other territories, for a worldwide total of $237.4 million against a production budget of $112 million.

Awards
Jack Black received a nomination for favorite movie actor at the 2011 Kids' Choice Awards, losing to Johnny Depp.

Black was also nominated for a Golden Raspberry Award for Worst Actor, losing to Ashton Kutcher.

See also
 List of films featuring miniature people
 List of films featuring powered exoskeletons

References

External links
 
 
 
 
 Some of the real dolls' house items used in the film

2010 films
2010 3D films
2010s adventure comedy films
2010s children's comedy films
2010s children's fantasy films
2010s fantasy adventure films
2010s fantasy comedy films
20th Century Fox films
American adventure comedy films
American fantasy adventure films
Davis Entertainment films
Dune Entertainment films
Films based on Gulliver's Travels
Films directed by Rob Letterman
Films produced by John Davis
Films scored by Henry Jackman
Films with screenplays by Joe Stillman
Films with screenplays by Nicholas Stoller
Films set in the Bermuda Triangle
Films shot in England
Films shot in Oxfordshire
Films shot at Pinewood Studios
2010 comedy films
2010s English-language films
2010s American films